Christopher Michael Wells (born August 7, 1988), known as Chris Wells or Beanie Wells, is a former American football running back. He was selected by the Arizona Cardinals in the first round (31st overall pick) of the 2009 NFL Draft out of Ohio State University.

High school career
Wells was a highly touted player out of high school, where he played football at Akron Garfield High School and ran track. His high school running back coach, Ben Dunn, said that Beanie was one of the most explosive play-makers he had seen in his 28 years at the school.  He was often considered the best recruit out of Ohio. Wells played at Akron Garfield High from 2002 to 2005, graduating early in December. In track, he was timed at 10.8 seconds in the 100 meters as a high school junior, and also recorded a 4.48 40-yard dash as a senior. He was listed as the top running back and All-American by Parade in 2006.

Wells was offered to play at schools such as Michigan and USC, but he always knew he was going to play at Ohio State, saying "I think I came out of my mom's womb wanting to go to Ohio State."

College career
Beanie's number during his career at Ohio State was #28.

Freshman season
During Wells's freshman year, he shared carries with Antonio Pittman, had a solid freshman year, and was a big part of the 2006 Buckeyes. The highlight of his freshman year came in the Ohio State–Michigan game where he broke a 52-yard run for a touchdown that put the Buckeyes ahead for the rest of the game.

Freshman statistics

Sophomore season
With Antonio Pittman going into the NFL Draft, Wells became the starting running back and started every game in his sophomore year for Ohio State. Wells rushed for 222 yards in the annual rivalry game against Michigan, the second most rushing yards by an Ohio State running back against Michigan.

Sophomore statistics

Junior season
Wells rushed 13 carries for 111 yards and a touchdown in his first game against the Youngstown State Penguins on August 30, 2008. He also suffered a foot injury. After missing three games, he returned to the starting lineup September 27, 2008, against Minnesota, where he rushed for 105 yards on 14 carries. He then followed that performance up with a 22 carry, 168 yard effort against Wisconsin, which included a 33-yard touchdown on the game's first possession and a 54-yard run to start the second half. In the November 15 game against Illinois, Wells leaped over an Illini defender, images of which were re-broadcast widely.

Junior statistics

Awards and honors
2006 Parade All-American
2006 U.S. Army All-American Bowl MVP
2007 All-Big Ten first-team
2007 Rivals.com Second-team All-American
2008 team MVP
31st overall pick by the Arizona Cardinals in the 2009 NFL draft.

Professional career

Wells was drafted in the first round (31st overall) by the Arizona Cardinals in the 2009 NFL Draft. He competed for the starting running back job with Tim Hightower.

On August 1, 2009, Wells was signed to a five-year contract. Later that day, he was carted off from practice with an ankle injury.

On August 28, Wells made his professional debut with the Cardinals in a preseason game against the Green Bay Packers. He ended the night with seven carries for a total of 46 yards and two touchdowns, including a 20-yard score in the second quarter.

On October 25, in the second quarter against the New York Giants, Wells ran 13 yards for his first NFL touchdown. In that game, Wells rushed for 67 yards on 14 attempts.

On December 20, Wells had his first career 100-yard game, against the Detroit Lions, with 17 carries for 110 yards and a touchdown.

On January 16, 2010, Wells scored his first postseason touchdown, a four-yard rush against the New Orleans Saints. He ended the season with 793 yards rushing, second-best among rookies after Knowshon Moreno. He also caught 12 passes for an 11.9 yard average.

For the 2011 NFL season, the Cardinals and coach Ken Whisenhunt placed a heavy emphasis on the ground-attack led by Wells. The decision was mostly influenced by the departure of Tim Hightower to the Washington Redskins, in turn giving the starting back role to Wells.

On November 27, 2011, Wells set a Cardinals single-game and personal record by rushing for 228 yards against the St. Louis Rams. Wells' performance eclipsed the team record previously held by LeShon Johnson, who rushed for 214 yards against the New Orleans Saints in 1996.

Wells finished the 2011 season with his first 1,000 yard season, ending with 1,047 yards on 245 carries (a 4.3 average) and 10 touchdowns.

On September 26, 2012, Wells was placed on the injured reserve list due to a severe turf toe injury but received the new "designated to return" tag and was expected to return in practice on November 7.

On Sunday, November 25, 2012, Wells made his first appearance back from Injured Reserve for Arizona's game against the St. Louis Rams, scoring his first two touchdowns of the season. His relationship with management soured near the end of the season. After gaining 4 yards against the Chicago Bears in the penultimate game of the season, Wells declared that he would be auditioning for the other 31 teams in his last appearance. Coach Whisenhunt held Wells out of the final game and on March 11, 2013, Wells was released by the Arizona Cardinals.

On October 9, 2013, Wells tore his Achilles tendon during a workout with the Baltimore Ravens.

After the injury, Wells did not sign with another NFL team.

NFL career statistics

Personal life
Wells was born August 7, 1988, in Akron, Ohio and is one of eleven children. His parents are James and Paulette Wells. The nickname Beanie was given to him by his family at a young age and he has said, "when I was young, my big brother said I was skinny like a bean pole."

References

External links

 Arizona Cardinals bio
 ESPN.com bio
 

1988 births
Living people
American football running backs
Arizona Cardinals players
Ohio State Buckeyes football players
Players of American football from Akron, Ohio
African-American players of American football
21st-century African-American sportspeople
20th-century African-American people